The Battle of Trebeshina or the Battle of Mal Trebeshinë, was a series of engagements fought between the Greek and Italian armies in south-eastern Albania during the Greco-Italian War.

Following the Greek capture of the strategic Këlcyrë/Klisura Pass on 10 January, four Italian divisions and one Blackshirt division of the Italian XXV Army Corps under Gen. Carlo Rossi attempted to recover the Trebeshinë mountain range by launching counter-attacks against the Greek II Army Corps (1st, 15th and 11th Infantry Divisions).

On 27 January 1941 the Greek III/4 Battalion under Major Ioannis Baldoumis captured Height 1923 and set up defensive positions in deep snow, while the I/5 Battalion under the command of Major Antonios Goulas captured Height 1620. Due to heavy snow and blizzards the Greeks were soon forced to abandon Trebeshina, which was subsequently occupied by two Italian Blackshirt battalions.

II Corps, reinforced with the Cretan 5th Division from III Corps, repulsed the Italian attack by 29 January and then attacked towards the Trebeshina massif. Against stiff resistance, the Cretan Division captured Trebeshina on 2 February, and the 15th Division captured the village of Bubeshi. On 14 February 1941 the 6th Infantry Regiment (Colonel Ioannis Theodorou) of the 3rd Division, repelled an Italian attack on the Skutara line near Height 504. The attack aimed to dislodge the Greek defensive line in the coastal sector, near the Albanian port city of Vlorë. The Greeks suffered 109 killed and wounded in the engagement.

By 17 February, the Greek had captured the mountain ranges but it was a costly victory, particularly for the Cretan Division, which suffered 5,776 killed, wounded or missing and had ceased to exist as a combat-worthy formation. The Greek positions at Trebeshina were subject to the main attack of  the Italian Spring Offensive in early March but were held until the Greek withdrawal south, following the German invasion of Greece on 6 April.

References

Trebeshina
Trebeshina
Trebeshina
1941 in Albania
Trebeshina
January 1941 events
February 1941 events